Miriam Anahí Mayorga (born 20 November 1989) is an Argentine footballer who plays as a defensive midfielder for Boca Juniors and the Argentina women's national team.

International career
Mayorga made her senior debut for Argentina at the 2019 FIFA Women's World Cup qualification (CONCACAF–CONMEBOL play-off) second leg against Panama on 13 November 2018. She started her career for Luna Park, in Bariloche.

References

1989 births
Living people
Sportspeople from Bariloche
Argentine women's footballers
Women's association football midfielders
UAI Urquiza (women) players
Boca Juniors (women) footballers
Argentina women's international footballers
2019 FIFA Women's World Cup players
Footballers at the 2019 Pan American Games
Medalists at the 2019 Pan American Games
Pan American Games medalists in football
Pan American Games silver medalists for Argentina